Atheos may refer to:
, an Ancient Greek term meaning 'godless'; see history of atheism
AtheOS, an operating system